is a city located in Kagoshima Prefecture, Japan. The city was founded on April 1, 1952.

As of 2008, the city has an estimated population of 23,887 and a population density of 178 persons per km2. The total area is 134.30 km2.

Geography

Climate 
Akune has a humid subtropical climate (Köppen climate classification Cfa) with hot summers and mild winters. Precipitation is significant throughout the year, and is heavier in summer, especially the months of June and July.

Demographics
Per Japanese census data, the population of Akune in 2020 is 19,270 people. Akune's population has been slowly declining since the census began in 1950. The population in 2020 is less than 50% of what it was in the 1950s.

References

External links 

  
 

Cities in Kagoshima Prefecture